Know thyself is translated from an ancient Greek aphorism (Greek: γνῶθι σεαυτόν or gnothi seauton).

Know thyself or Know yourself may also refer to:

Books
Gnothi Seauton: Know Yourself, a 1734 poetry book by John Arbuthnot and others
Conócete a ti mismo (English: Know Yourself), a 1913 book by the Spanish philosopher Joaquín Trincado Mateo

Music
"Know Yourself", song by Sizzla from Rise to the Occasion
No Thyself, the fifth studio album by Magazine released in 2011
"Know Yourself", song by Drake from his mixtape If You're Reading This It's Too Late

Other
"Know Thyself", an episode of the NBC television drama series Third Watch first broadcast in 2000

See also
Gnothi seauton (disambiguation)